Magnus Gottfried Lichtwer (30 January 1719, in Wurzen – 7 July 1783, in Halberstadt) was a German fabulist.

Biography
His father of the same name was a jurist. The younger Lichtwer studied law at Leipzig and Wittenberg. His chief work is to be found in the Vier Bücher Aesopischer Fabeln (Four books of fables in the manner of Aesop; 1748). There is a collection of his Schriften (Writings; 1828) edited by Ernst Ludwig von Pott (Lichtwer's grandson) and Friedrich Cramer which contains a biography. The Austrian composer Joseph Haydn set several of his fables in his secular canons, or a capella songs (Hob. XXVIIb).

Notes

References
  This source reports him being Canon of Saint Mauritius which neither German Wikipedia nor ADB nor NDB have any mention. NDB reports his date of death as 1788 rather than 1783.
 Magnus Gottfried Lichtwer article on German Wikipedia (visited June 19, 2011)

External links

 

1719 births
1783 deaths
German-language poets
People from Wurzen
Fabulists
German male poets